Hengst may refer to:

 Hengst (surname)
 Hengst Automotive
 Hengst, the highest mountain summit in Schrattenfluh, part of the Swiss Alps

See also
 Hengist (disambiguation)